Bridge Pass is a high pass between Surveyors Range and Nash Range, at the upper reaches of Dickey Glacier and Algie Glacier, affording a passage from the Nimrod Glacier region to Beaumont Bay. It was named by the New Zealand Geological Survey Antarctic Expedition (1960–61) for Captain Lawrence D. Bridge, Royal New Zealand Engineers, leader at Scott Base from November 1960 to February 1961.

References
 

Mountain passes of the Ross Dependency
Shackleton Coast